Seven Natural Wonders is a television series that was broadcast on BBC Two from 3 May to 20 June 2005. The programme takes an area of England each week and, from votes by the people living in that area, shows the 'seven natural wonders' of that area in a programme.

Episodes and locations

The series covered eight regions of England, having originated as a 'local' television project.

There was also a series, looking at a similar selection of 'man-made' wonders for each of eleven regions of England.

References

External links
 Seven Natural Wonders at BBC Online
BBC Television shows
7 Seven Natural Wonders
Nature-related lists
2005 British television series debuts
2005 British television series endings